Oëx is a village in the Rhône-Alpes region of France, below Pointe d'Areu in the Arve valley. It is part of the commune Magland in Haute-Savoie department.

References

Villages in Auvergne-Rhône-Alpes